The 1979–80 Scottish League Cup was the thirty-fourth season of Scotland's second football knockout competition. The competition was won by Dundee United, who defeated Aberdeen in the replayed Final.

First round

First Leg

Second Leg

Second round

First Leg

Second Leg

Third round

First Leg

Second Leg

Quarter-finals

First Leg

Second Leg

Semi-finals

Final

Replay

References

General

Specific

League Cup
Scottish League Cup seasons